Plasmodium osmaniae is a parasite of the genus Plasmodium subgenus Vinckeia.

Like all Plasmodium species P. osmaniae has both vertebrate and insect hosts. The vertebrate hosts for this parasite are mammals.

Description 

The parasite was first described by Short in 1961. It was renamed Plasmodium shortii by Bray in 1963 and still later this species was then reclassified as Plasmodium inui.

References 

osmaniae